Derek Peardon (born 24 September 1950) is a former Australian rules football player who played in the VFL between 1968 and 1971 for the Richmond Football Club.

At the age of five Peardon and his sister Annette were taken from their family on Cape Barren Island and placed in orphanages in Launceston. A champion schoolboy footballer and gifted professional runner, Peardon was the first indigenous footballer to play for the Tigers.

Selected in the 1965 All-Australian Schoolboys' team, he played in the 1966 Richmond Fourths premiership side as well as the 1967 Under 19s premiership and 1971 Reserves premiership, his last game for the club.

Returning to Tasmania in 1972, Peardon played six seasons for City South, including premierships in 1972 and 1974.  During this period he won two club best and fairest awards as well as the Northern Tasmanian Football Association best and fairest in 1973.  He represented the NTFA on nine occasions and Tasmania twice.  He also played one season, 1977, for North Hobart in the Tasmanian Football League.

During his time at Richmond one of his teammates was Kevin Sheedy.  Sheedy credits Peardon with initiating his interest in indigenous Australia.

References 

 Hogan P: The Tigers of Old, Richmond FC, Melbourne 1996

External links
 
 

1950 births
Living people
Richmond Football Club players
Indigenous Australian players of Australian rules football
North Hobart Football Club players
City-South Football Club players
Australian rules footballers from Tasmania
Tasmanian Football Hall of Fame inductees